Jerrold (Yoram) Kessel (March 3, 1944 – February 24, 2011) was an Israeli journalist, sports journalist, author, and foreign correspondent.

Biography
Jerrold (Yoram) Kessel immigrated to Israel from South Africa at an early age. He helped to introduce cricket to Israel, playing for the Israel national cricket team in the ICC Trophy from 1979 to 1990. He played cricket for Team Israel at the 1973 Maccabiah Games.

Kessel died from cancer at the age of 66. He was survived by his wife, Lorraine, their son, Ariel, and four grandchildren. His funeral was held at Givat HaShlosha in central Israel.

Media career
Kessel was a news editor for the Jerusalem Post, reported on the Middle East for CNN from its Jerusalem bureau from 1990 to 2003. He was known for his iconic white beard. He had been called "one of Israel’s leading English-language journalists." He initially worked for Israel Radio, the Jerusalem correspondent for the London Jewish Chronicle, and the Jerusalem Post before joining CNN as an on-air correspondent in 1990.

He covered major events affecting Israel for CNN, including the Oslo Accords and the assassination of former Israeli Prime Minister Yitzhak Rabin. Kessel began producing and co-producing independent television programming after leaving CNN in 2003.

He also authored a book of soccer and began writing a sports column for the daily newspaper, Haaretz, the last of which was published a week before his death in 2011.

See also
Israeli journalism
Sports in Israel

References

1944 births
2011 deaths
Competitors at the 1973 Maccabiah Games
Israeli journalists
Israeli columnists
Israeli television journalists
Maccabiah Games competitors for Israel
Maccabiah Games cricketers
CNN people
South African Jews
South African emigrants to Israel
Israeli Jews
Israeli cricketers
Deaths from cancer in Israel
Wicket-keepers